Sir Francis Henry Dillon Bell  (31 March 1851 – 13 March 1936) was a New Zealand lawyer and politician who served as the 20th prime minister of New Zealand from 14 to 30 May 1925. He was the first New Zealand-born prime minister, holding office in a caretaker capacity following the death of William Massey.

Bell was born in Nelson. His father, Sir Dillon Bell, was also a politician. Bell attended Auckland Grammar School and Otago Boys' High School before going on to St John's College, Cambridge. He returned to New Zealand to practise law, settling in Wellington and eventually becoming president of the New Zealand Law Society. Bell served as Mayor of Wellington from 1891 to 1893 and from 1896 to 1897. He was elected to the House of Representatives in 1893, after two previous defeats, but served only a single term before retiring in 1896 to return to the legal profession.

In 1912, Bell was appointed to the Legislative Council as a representative of the Reform Party. In the Reform Government under William Massey, he served as Minister of Internal Affairs (1912–1915), Minister of Immigration (1912–1920), Attorney-General (1918–1926), Minister of Health (1919–1920), and Minister of External Affairs (1923–1926). When Massey died in office in 1925, Bell – aged 74 – was commissioned as his replacement for 16 days while the party elected a new leader (Gordon Coates). Bell retired from politics the following year. Only Henry Sewell served a shorter term as prime minister, and only Walter Nash served as prime minister at a greater age.

Early life
Bell was born in Nelson, the eldest son of Sir Dillon Bell. His mother was Margaret Hort (who was Jewish, but became a Christian). Arthur Bell was a younger brother. He attended Auckland Grammar School and Otago Boys' High School. At Otago Boys he was the Dux. After finishing high school, he travelled to England where he attended St John's College, Cambridge, receiving a BA in 1873. On returning to New Zealand, he began practising law in Wellington, being involved in Bell, Gully, MacKenzie and Evans. As a youth in the 1870s, he also played two first-class cricket matches for Wellington.

Bell served as Crown Solicitor in Wellington from 1878 to 1890, and from 1902 to 1910. He was a prominent member of both the local and national law societies. He served as the latter's president from 1901 to 1918.

He married Caroline Robinson on 24 April 1878 at St John's Church in Christchurch. She was the third daughter of William Robinson. They had four daughters and four sons. His son William Henry Dillon Bell (1884–1917) was a Member of Parliament, but resigned and volunteered for service in World War I. He was killed in 1917. Another son Cheviot Bell was appointed to the Legislative Council as a member of the suicide squad by the First National Government on 27 July 1950 to vote for the abolition of the council, so served to 31 December 1950. The two children of his brother Alfred, Brenda and Frank Bell, became notable radio pioneers.

Political career

His political career began with being elected Mayor of Wellington in 1891, 1892 and 1896.

In 1912, the Reform Party came to power, and on 10 July 1912 Bell was appointed to the Legislative Council. He became Minister of Internal Affairs (1912–1915), and Minister of Immigration (1912–1920). He was Attorney-General (1918–1926). He was the first Commissioner of State Forests, and from 1923 he would also serve as the Minister of External Affairs.

He represented New Zealand at the League of Nations in 1922. He would also attend the allied conferences at Genoa and the Hague.

Having been appointed a Knight Commander of the Order of St Michael and St George on 3 June 1915, Bell was promoted to Knight Grand Cross of the same order in the 1923 New Year Honours. He was appointed to the Privy Council on 1 February 1926.

Prime Minister

On returning to New Zealand, Bell became Acting Prime Minister while William Massey was in London. Massey's health began to fail, and Bell took over most of his roles. He officially became prime minister on 14 May 1925 after Massey's death on 10 May. He served as prime minister for the next 16 days. Bell declined the party's offer to become Prime Minister and was replaced by Gordon Coates.

After giving up his portfolios in 1926, he returned to the League of Nations with Coates.

In 1935, he was awarded the King George V Silver Jubilee Medal.

Death
Bell's wife, Caroline (born 1853), died in Wellington on 8 September 1935. Bell died in Wellington on 13 March 1936.

Commemoration
Bell Road in Wellington is named after him.

Notes

References

External links

Biography of his father, Sir Francis Dillon Bell

|-

|-

|-

|-

|-

|-

|-

|-

|-

|-

1851 births
1936 deaths
Alumni of St John's College, Cambridge
Attorneys-General of New Zealand
People educated at Auckland Grammar School
People educated at Otago Boys' High School
Mayors of Wellington
Members of the New Zealand Legislative Council
Prime Ministers of New Zealand
New Zealand education ministers
New Zealand foreign ministers
Health ministers of New Zealand
Immigration ministers of New Zealand
Interior ministers of New Zealand
New Zealand Knights Grand Cross of the Order of St Michael and St George
19th-century New Zealand lawyers
New Zealand people of English descent
New Zealand people of Jewish descent
Leaders of political parties in New Zealand
Reform Party (New Zealand) MPs
People from Nelson, New Zealand
Permanent Representatives of New Zealand to the League of Nations
Reform Party (New Zealand) MLCs
New Zealand MPs for Wellington electorates
New Zealand Anglicans
New Zealand cricketers
Wellington cricketers
Members of the New Zealand House of Representatives
New Zealand King's Counsel
Unsuccessful candidates in the 1890 New Zealand general election
Burials at Karori Cemetery
19th-century New Zealand politicians
Jewish New Zealand politicians
Jewish prime ministers
New Zealand members of the Privy Council of the United Kingdom
New Zealand politicians awarded knighthoods
Francis
Justice ministers of New Zealand
Johnston family